Rob Campanella  is a musician, best known as a Los Angeles producer, engineer, and member of The Quarter After.

Music career

Producer and engineer

Campanella has produced and engineered albums for his own band The Quarter After, and for clients including The Brian Jonestown Massacre, The Tyde, Beachwood Sparks, Goldrush, Dead Meadow, Mia Doi Todd, The Morning After Girls, and Scarling.

Discography

Albums/CDs

The Ethers, The Ethers, album (1999) – producer, engineer
Sunstorm, Sunstorm, album (2000) – producer, engineer, mixing, guitar
The Tyde, Once, album (2001) – producer, engineer, mixing
The Brian Jonestown Massacre, Bravery, Repetition & Noise, album (2001) – producer, engineer, Hammond organ, acoustic guitar, Melotron flute, Spanish guitar, Vox fuzz repeater
Cloud Eleven, Orange and Green and Yellow and Near, album (2002) – mandolin
The Tyde, Twice, album (2003) – producer, engineer, mixing
Dead Meadow, from Buddyhead Presents: Gimme Skelter, album, "Let's Jump In" (2003) — producer, engineer
The Brian Jonestown Massacre, And This Is Our Music, album (2003) – producer, engineer, Hammond organ, dobro, mandolin, piano
The Tyde, from Stop Me If You Think You've Heard This One Before: 25 Years of Rough Trade, album, "Tell Me" (2003) — engineer
Meow Meow, Snow Gas Bones, album (2004), — mixing
Dead Meadow, from Matador at Fifteen album, "The Whirlings" (2004) – producer, engineer
 Frausdots, Couture, Couture, Couture, album (2004) – mandolin
 Daydream Nation, Bella Vendetta, album (2004) – slide guitar
 Mia Doi Todd, Manzanita, album (2005) – producer, engineer, mixing, dulcimer, mandolin, piano, electric guitar
Dusty Sound System, Days of Horror, Nights of Splendor, album (2005) – producer, engineer, guitar
The Quarter After, The Quarter After, album (2005) – producer, engineer, guitar, vocals, piano, Mellotron, organ, dobro, mandolin, bass guitar
C24C, Stay Gold, album (2005) – producer, engineer, mixing
Scarling., So Long, Scarecrow, album (2005) – producer, engineer
 Goldrush, Ozona, album (2005) – producer
Imogene, Imogene, album (2005) – engineer
 The Tyde, Three's Co., album (2006) – producer, engineer, mixing, slide guitar
 Mia Doi Todd, from La Ninja: Amor and Other Dreams of Manzanita, album (2006) "Norwegian Wood" — producer, engineer, acoustic Guitar, Mellotron, and "The Last Night Of Winter" — re-mixer
 The Abe Lincoln Story, Kings Of The Soul Punk Swing, album (2007) – engineer
 The Lovetones, Axiom, album (2007) – producer, engineer, Mellotron, slide guitar, bazouki
 Dead Meadow, Old Growth, album (2008) – producer, engineer
 The Stereo Workers Union, God Bless The Stereo Workers Union!, album (2008) – producer, engineer, guitar, bass, Mellotron, mandolin, sitar, tambourine
 The Quarter After, Changes Near, album (2008) – producer, engineer, mixing, guitar, vocals, Mellotron, piano, Hammond organ, tamboura, dobro
 Meow Meow,  Meow Meow, album (2008) – producer, engineer, mixing
 The Lovetones, Dimensions, album (2009) – producer, engineer, mixing, Mellotron, piano
 Lower Heaven, ASHES, album (2009) – engineer, Mellotron
 Chief Nowhere, Chief Nowhere, album (2010) – engineer, Mellotron, Leslie vocals
 Seth Swirsky, Watercolor Day, album (2010) – mixing, engineer, sitar, tampura
 The Lovetones, Lost, album (2010) – engineer, mixing, Mellotron

Singles and EPs
Basement Youth Miracle, self-titled EP, (1999); producer, engineer, mixing
The Drummed, "Eraserhead", EP (1997) – guitar
The Drummed, "Mosquito", EP (1998) – guitar
The Drummed, "The Drummed", EP (1999) – guitar, engineer, mixing
The Tyde, "Strangers Again"/"Improper" (2000) – engineer, mixing
The Tyde, "All My Bastard Children"/"Silver's Okay Michelle" (2001) – engineer, mixing
Beachwood Sparks, "Once We Were Trees"/"Wake Up Little Susie" (2001) – producer, engineer
The Tyde, "The World's Strongest Man/"Sullen Eyes" (2001) – engineer, mixing
The Tyde, "Blood Brothers EP" (2002) – engineer, mixing
The Tyde, "Go Ask Yer Dad"/"Blood Brothers" (CD single also includes "Play It As It Lays") (May 2003) (US) – engineer, mixing
Meow Meow, "Cracked"/"Not Worth Recovering"/"Nature Is A Machine" (2004) – engineer, mixing
Scarling., "Crispin Glover"/"Art of Pretension" (2004) – producer, engineer
Scarling., "Crispin Glover"/"Love Becomes A Ghost" (2004) – producer, engineer
The Tyde, "Look By in Anger"/"Roadrunner" (2004) – engineer, mixing
Frausdots, "Dead Wrong"/"Pastels" (2004) – producer, engineer
Frausdots, "Gonna Lose It" (2005) – producer, engineer, mixing
Scarling. / The Willowz, split 7-inch "We Are the Music Makers" (2005) – producer, engineer
Scarling., "Staring to the Sun" (2006) – producer, engineer, mixing
The Quarter After, "Too Much Too Think About" (2008) – producer, engineer, guitar, vocals, sitar
Spider Problem, "Natural Selections EP" (2008) – producer, engineer, mixing
Scarling., "Who Wants To Die For Art?" (2013) – producer, engineer, mixing

Filmography 
 DiG! (2004)

References

External links
 The Quarter After
 The Quarter After on Myspace

Living people
American rock guitarists
American male guitarists
American indie rock musicians
Place of birth missing (living people)
Record producers from California
The Brian Jonestown Massacre members
1966 births